85th Division or 85th Infantry Division may refer to:

Infantry divisions:
 85th Division (People's Republic of China), 1949–1952; later the 2nd Garrison Division of Nanjing Military Region
 85th Division (2nd Formation)(People's Republic of China), 1969–1985
 85th Landwehr Division (German Empire) 
 85th Infantry Division (Wehrmacht) 

 85th Motor Rifle Division, Soviet Union
 85th Infantry Division (United States) 

Aviation divisions:
 85th Air Division, United States